A boksi (Nepali: बोक्सी) is a person staying alone and has knowledge of witchcraft, Tuna Muna and Tantra. According to Tantra-shastra and Shivapurana, a boksi is a woman who is different from normal god or goddess and has her own language. Boksi has a divine power and is capable to heal various diseases. A Boksi is capable to differentiate god, goddess, ghosts, pret, pichas or dakini. She is able to call any of the goddess or witches and ask them to do a job for her. According to mythology, Parvati, the wife of Shiva was the originator of boksi knowledge. She gave this power to seven of her sisters. From the youngest sister, this knowledge is believed to be transferred to the humans.  

Mostly elderly women are the most likely to have been accused of being a boksi.

In contemporary culture
Boksi - a Nepali book on child psychology written by Balkrishna Sama.
 Boksi Ko Ghar (Translation: House of Boksi) - a social drama written by Sulakshan Bharati

Legislation
According to Nepalese law, the person accusing someone a Boksi may be subjected to criminal offence and is liable to pay up to NPR 100,000 and a prison sentence of up to five years.

See also
Nepalese folklore
Witch-hunts in Nepal

References

Nepalese folklore
Tantra
Witchcraft